Michael Clarke is an Australian retired jockey who is best known for riding At Talaq to victory in the 1986 Melbourne Cup.

References

Australian jockeys
Living people
Year of birth missing (living people)
Place of birth missing (living people)
20th-century Australian people